San Rocco is a small Renaissance style, Roman Catholic church located at the banks of the Adigetto in the city of Lendinara, in the province of Rovigo, region of Veneto, Italy.

History
This church, just outside the medieval city walls, was built in 1516, and dedicated to Saint Roch, the patron saint of those affected by the plague, which had afflicted the town in 1511. Adjacent to the church was a convent of the Order of the Serviti, suppressed in 1656. Between 1923 and 1927 the church became a monument for those fallen (caduti) in the first world war. The interior was frescoed with stories of the First World War by the Veronese painter Angelo Zamboni.

References

16th-century Roman Catholic church buildings in Italy
Renaissance architecture in Veneto
Roman Catholic churches in Lendinara
Roman Catholic churches completed in 1516